Lilo is a feminine nickname (sometimes a short form or hypocorism of Liselotte or Lieselotte) and a surname. It may refer to the following people:

Nickname
 Carmine Galante (1910–1979), American mobster
 Elisabeth Lilo Gloeden (1903–1944), German lawyer executed for harboring a member of the 20 July plot to assassinate Hitler
 Liselotte Herrmann (1909–1938), German communist executed by Nazi Germany
 Lindsay Lohan (born 1986), American actress
 Rob Levin (1955–2006), founder of the Freenode IRC network
 Lilo Milchsack (1905–1992), German promoter of post-war German-British relations
 Liselotte Pulver (born 1929), Swiss actress sometimes credited as Lilo Pulver
 Lieselotte Lilo Ramdohr (1913–2013), member of the German anti-Nazi student resistance group White Rose
 Liselotte Lilo Rasch-Naegele (1914–1978), German painter, graphic artist, fashion designer and book illustrator

Surname
 Gordon Darcy Lilo (born 1965), Solomon Islander politician, Prime Minister of the Solomon Islands from 2011 to 2014
 Serge Lilo (born 1985), New Zealand rugby union footballer 
 Vunga Lilo (born 1983), Tongan rugby union footballer

See also
 Lilo (disambiguation)
 Lilou, a French female given name originally spelled Liló in Occitan

Lists of people by nickname
Feminine given names
German feminine given names